Elle Klarskov Jørgensen (born 27 March 1958) is a Danish sculptor. Born in Slagelse, she attended the Royal Danish Academy of Fine Arts where she studied under Willy Ørskov and Hein Heinsen (1978–87). She has exhibited installations and more simple works inspired by Constructivism and Minimalism.

References

External links
Examples of Klarskov Jørgensen's work from Kunst.dk*[http://www.elleklarskov.artmotion.dk

1958 births
Living people
Danish sculptors
Danish women artists
People from Slagelse
Royal Danish Academy of Fine Arts alumni